Hospital Ramos Mejía is a hospital in Buenos Aires, Argentina.

Notable patients who have been in the hospital 
 José María Gatica, Argentine boxer, was hospitalized after a fight in 1947.

References

Hospitals in Buenos Aires
Balvanera
Hospitals established in 1883